Waverley School is a mixed all-through school located in Small Heath, Birmingham, England.

History
The co-educational Waverley Grammar School was situated between Byron Road and Waverley Road, now next to the A45–Muntz St (B4145) roundabout, and next to Small Heath Park. This school is now Small Heath Leadership Academy.

In 2006, Waverley was recognized as one of the most improved schools at GCSE level in England. The 2010 Ofsted inspection rated the school Outstanding.

The school has expanded in recent years to become an all-through school for primary, secondary and sixth form education.

Admissions
Waverley is a boys and girls school for pupils age 4 - 19.

It is situated just south of Bordesley Green's Heartlands Hospital, between Hob Moor Road and Kingscliff Road.

References

Secondary schools in Birmingham, West Midlands
Primary schools in Birmingham, West Midlands
Academies in Birmingham, West Midlands